Subtraction is a mathematical operation.

Subtraction or subtract may also refer to:
 - (album), pronounced "Subtract", a 2023 album by Ed Sheeran
Subtraction (film), a 2022 Iranian thriller
Subtraction (Babyland song), from the 2008 album Cavecraft
Subtraction (Sepultura song), from the 1991 album Arise

See also
 Minus sign